A Sure Thing is an album by American trumpeter Blue Mitchell with orchestra recorded in 1962 and released on the Riverside label.

Reception

The Allmusic review by Scott Yanow awarded the album 4 stars and stated "Trumpeter Blue Mitchell is well featured on this CD reissue with a nonet arranged by Jimmy Heath. The music is straightahead but, thanks to Heath's arrangements, sometimes unpredictable".

Track listing
 "West Coast Blues" (Wes Montgomery) – 5:40
 "I Can't Get Started" (Vernon Duke, Ira Gershwin) – 3:48
 "Blue on Blue" (Jimmy Heath) – 4:48
 "A Sure Thing" (Gershwin, Jerome Kern) – 4:34
 "Hootie Blues" (Jay McShann) – 5:24
 "Hip to It" (Blue Mitchell) – 5:00
 "Gone With the Wind" (Herb Magidson, Allie Wrubel) – 5:57
 Recorded at Plaza Sound Studios in New York City on March 7 (tracks 2 & 5), March 8 (tracks 3 & 4), and March 28 (tracks 1, 6 & 7), 1962

Personnel
Blue Mitchell, Clark Terry (tracks 1-6) – trumpet
Jimmy Heath – tenor saxophone, arrangement
Jerome Richardson (tracks 1-6) – flute, alto saxophone
Pepper Adams (tracks 2-5), Pat Patrick (tracks 1 & 6) – baritone saxophone
Julius Watkins (tracks 1-6) – French horn
Wynton Kelly – piano
Sam Jones – bass
Albert Heath – drums

References

Riverside Records albums
Blue Mitchell albums
1962 albums
Albums produced by Orrin Keepnews
Albums arranged by Jimmy Heath